St Benedict's College is a private, boarding, English medium and Catholic high school for boys in Bedfordview, Germiston in the Gauteng province of South Africa, The boys write Independent Examination Board (IEB). It is one of the top academic schools in the country, The boys high school was established in 1958.

History

Academics 
Few Schools can be compared with St Benedict's College's Matric results over the years. No Matric has failed at St Benedicts College since 1974, and the rate of University Entrance Pass hovers around 95%. The school follows the S.A. National Curriculum from Reception in Grade R through to Matriculation in Grade 12. In Grade 12, boys write the National Senior Certificate Examination of the Independent Examinations Board.

Sport 
St Benedict's College has produced many athletes and Top Sportsman. Luther Obi is currently playing for the Blue Bulls in Currie Cup Rugby competition in South Africa, and has represented South Africa at Junior (U/20) international level. He matriculated in 2011. Vincent Breet  has represented South Africa in Senior Rowing and also matriculated in 2011. Shingirai Hlanguyo and Mosolwa Mafuma have both won Gold Medals in 100m Athletics for St Benedicts, and also play First Team Rugby.

Mosolwa Mafuma also played for the Shimlas in the 2016 Varsity Cup Competition. He was the second highest try-scorer (7 tries), and was awarded the Player That Rocks (Player of The Tournament) award. He was also selected for the South Africa national under-20 rugby union team for the 2016 World U/20 Championship in England.

Summer sports

Rowing 
St Benedicts College is currently one of the top Rowing Schools in South Africa, having won the SA Rowing Champs 26 years in a row. Rowing was introduced at St Benedicts in the 1987 summer season.

Rugby 
Despite only having started Rugby in 1998, St Benedicts has quickly grown to a strong Rugby school, having finished their 2015 Season ranked 13 in the country. St Benedicts biggest rivals include St John's College, St Stithians College, Jeppe Boys, and Pretoria Boys High whom they beat them for the first time in 2015 in their history, 45-36. St Benedicts once again beat Pretoria Boys in 2016, winning 54-13. Several St Benedict's Boys have been chosen to be Craven Week representatives.

Notable alumni
The final year at St Benedict's College are in alphabetical order.
 Roman di Clemente (1994) - South African professional  rower (Anthens 2004 Bronze medalist Men's pair) 
 Mosolwa Mafuma (2011)  - South African professional rugby player
 Shingirai Hlungayo (2016)  - South African professional rugby player
 Vincent Breet (2011) -  South African professional rower
 Luther Obi (2011) - South African professional rugby player.

References

Boys' schools in South Africa
Schools in Germiston
Schools in Johannesburg
Private schools in Gauteng
1958 establishments in South Africa
Educational institutions established in 1958